Guru Nanak Stadium is a football and athletics stadium located in Ludhiana, India. It is currently the home ground of I-League team RoundGlass Punjab FC. With seating capacity of 30,000 spectators, there is a provision of 8 lane synthetic track. The track conforms to international standards for conduct of any athletic meeting.

The adjacent indoor stadium has been used for the National Basketball Championship.

Other events

It had the privilege of hosting 31st National Games in 2001.

Kabaddi
Stadium has hosted some domestic kabaddi matches. It also hosted matches of Kabaddi World Cup.

References

Basketball venues in India
Football venues in Punjab, India
Sports venues in Punjab, India
Buildings and structures in Ludhiana
RoundGlass Punjab FC
Year of establishment missing